Clorinda is a city located in the province of Formosa, Argentina. It is located 115 km north-northeast from the provincial capital Formosa, at the easternmost tip of the province, 4 km from the Paraguayan border, on the right bank of the Pilcomayo River, 10 km before its confluence with the Paraguay River. Opposite Clorinda lies the Paraguayan capital, Asunción. The two cities are linked by the San Ignacio de Loyola International Bridge. Clorinda also marks the junction between National Route 11 and National Route 86.

Transport
The city is served by Clorinda Airport, which has, as of 2021, no commercial airline service. The nearest commercial airport is Silvio Pettirossi International Airport in Asuncion, with nine passenger and two cargo airlines serving it. There's also the Clorinda Bus Terminal Station that offers services to other Northern Argentine destinations,  through the National Route 12

Notable residents
José Mayans, politician and national senator
Charo Bogarín, musician and actress
Carlos Soto, footballer

References

External links
 

Populated places in Formosa Province
Cities in Argentina
Formosa Province
Argentina